The Guam Department of Chamorro Affairs is an agency of the government of Guam dealing with the Chamorro people and Chamorro culture. The agency is located in the DNA Building in Hagåtña.

Chamorro Village, a market and a cultural attraction, is a division of the Department of Chamorro Affairs.

References

External links
 Guam Department of Chamorro Affairs

Indigenous affairs ministries
Government of Guam